Puncturella asturiana, common name the hawk puncturella, is a species of sea snail, a marine gastropod mollusk in the family Fissurellidae, the keyhole limpets.

Description

The shell can grow to be 15 mm to 25 mm in length.

Distribution
This species occurs in European waters (off Spain), the Caribbean Sea and the Gulf of Mexico; the Atlantic Ocean off North Carolina, Georgia and Florida. It lives at a depth of 182 m to 2017 m.

References

 Gofas, S.; Le Renard, J.; Bouchet, P. (2001). Mollusca, in: Costello, M.J. et al. (Ed.) (2001). European register of marine species: a check-list of the marine species in Europe and a bibliography of guides to their identification. Collection Patrimoines Naturels, 50: pp. 180–213
 Rosenberg, G., F. Moretzsohn, and E. F. García. 2009. Gastropoda (Mollusca) of the Gulf of Mexico, Pp. 579–699 in Felder, D.L. and D.K. Camp (eds.), Gulf of Mexico–Origins, Waters, and Biota. Biodiversity. Texas A&M Press, College Station, Texas

External links
 
 Fischer P. (1882–1883). Diagnoses d'espèces nouvelles de mollusques recueillis dans le cours des expéditions scientifiques de l'aviso "Le Travailleur" (1880 et 1881). Journal de Conchyliologie 30: 49–53 [1882], 273–277
 Locard A. (1897–1898). Expéditions scientifiques du Travailleur et du Talisman pendant les années 1880, 1881, 1882 et 1883. Mollusques testacés. Paris, Masson. vol. 1 [1897], p. 1–516 pl. 1-22; vol. 2 [1898], p. 1–515, pl. 1-18
 Gofas, S.; Luque, Á. A.; Templado, J.; Salas, C. (2017). A national checklist of marine Mollusca in Spanish waters. Scientia Marina. 81(2) : 241–254, and supplementary online material

Fissurellidae
Gastropods described in 1882